In geometry, a jack is a 3D cross shape consisting of three orthogonal ellipsoids. Sometimes four small spheres are added to the ends of two ellipsoids, to more closely resemble a playing piece from the game of jacks. Sometimes any 3D cross shape, consisting of cylinders, boxes or lines instead of ellipsoids, are also included.

See also 
 Knucklebones

References 

Elementary geometry
Geometric shapes
Spherical geometry